The Bracks Ministry was the 65th ministry of the Government of Victoria. It was led by the Premier of Victoria, Steve Bracks, and Deputy Premier, John Thwaites. It succeeded the Kennett Ministry on 20 October 1999, following the defeat of Jeff Kennett's Liberal government in the 1999 state election.

There were three reshuffles within the Bracks Ministry. The first took place on 12 February 2002.

Cabinet

References

Victoria (Australia) ministries
Australian Labor Party ministries in Victoria (Australia)
Ministries of Elizabeth II